Li Zhong is a fictional character in Water Margin, one of the Four Great Classical Novels of Chinese literature. Nicknamed "Tiger Slaying General", he ranks 86th among the 108 Stars of Destiny and 50th among the 72 Earthly Fiends.

Background
A native of Haozhou (濠州; around present-day Chuzhou, Anhui), Li Zhong makes a living as he drifts around by teaching martial arts and performing fighting stunts in public for tips from onlookers and as a way to push his medicinal items. He is nicknamed "Tiger Slaying General" as he is muscular and looks like one who could kill a tiger.

Becoming an outlaw
Li Zhong becomes the first martial arts teacher of Shi Jin when he is at Huayin County and is hired by Shi's father. Shi Jin eventually finds a far more competent teacher Wang Jin, a former imperial troops instructor. After killing constables sent to arrest him over his association with the bandits of Mount Shaohua, Shi leaves for Weizhou (渭州; around present-day Pingliang, Gansu) in search of Wang Jin. At Weizhou he comes to know Lu Da, a local garrison officer. The two run into Li Zhong when he is doing his usual roadside stunts show.

Later Lu Da unwittingly boxes a butcher to death who had been blackmailing a woman for money after using a scheme to bed her. Hearing that, Li Zhong flees Weizhou. He passes by Mount Peach Blossom in Qingzhou (in present-day Shandong), where Zhou Tong and his bandit gang set upon him to rob him. But Zhou is beaten, and in admiration of Li's fighting skill he offers his position to Li, who accepts it.

Zhou Tong happens on the daughter of one Squire Liu, who lives near Mount Peach Blossom, and wants her to be his wife.. Although reluctant, the old man could not object. On the wedding night, when Zhou Tong reaches the bed in the bridal room in the squire's house, he is shocked to find a burly monk there, who gives him a good thrash.

Zhou Tong escapes back to the stronghold and asks Li Zhong to get back at the monk for him. Li comes to Squire Liu's house and is surprised to find the guy to be Lu Da. Lu, after killing the butcher, has become a monk and adopted the Buddhist name Zhishen at the monastery on Mount Wutai to hide his identity. He is on the way to another temple in the imperial capital Dongjing (東京; present-day Kaifeng, Henan) after being expelled from Mount Wutai for causing too many troubles. He passed by Squire Liu's house and had lied to the old man that he could persuade Zhou Tong to drop the idea of marrying his daughter. He then replaced the girl in the bridal room where he ambushed Zhou. 

To give face to Lu Zhishen, Li Zhong tells Zhou Tong to drop the idea of marrying Squire Liu's daughter. Zhou Tong readily agrees. Lu Zhishen stays at the stronghold for a few days before resuming his journey.

Joining Liangshan
When the imperial general Huyan Zhuo is fleeing to Qingzhou after being beaten in his military mission to stamp out the outlaws of Liangshan Marsh, he passes by Mount Peach Blossom and puts up at an inn. His horse, a gift from Emperor Huizong, is stolen by the men of Zhou Tong that night. Mad at the loss, Huyan suggests to Qingzhou's governor Murong Yanda that he would help him wipe out the local bandits to redeem his defeat at Liangshan.

Finding themselves no match for Huyan, Li Zhong and Zhou Tong turn to the outlaws of the nearby Mount Twin Dragons under Lu Zhishen for help. Concluding that Huyan is a formidable warrior, both strongholds approach Liangshan for assistance. Song Jiang leads a force to Qingzhou, where he captures and wins over Huyan. Li Zhong and Zhou Tong are absorbed into Liangshan along with the bandits of Mount Twin Dragons.

Campaigns and death
Li Zhong is appointed as one of the leaders of the Liangshan infantry after the 108 Stars of Destiny came together in what is called the Grand Assembly. He participates in the campaigns against the Liao invaders and rebel forces in Song territory following amnesty from Emperor Huizong for Liangshan.

In the attack on Yuling Pass (昱嶺關; near present-day Zhupu Village, She County, Anhui) in the campaign against Fang La, Li Zhong and four other Liangshan heroes are shot to death by the archers of Pang Wanchun. Shi Jin, who leads them, also falls being shot by Pang himself.

References
 
 
 
 
 
 
 

72 Earthly Fiends
Fictional characters from Anhui